Gogsand is a village in Piro block of Bhojpur district, Bihar, India. It is located west of Piro. As of 2011, its population was 937, in 149 households.

References 

Villages in Bhojpur district, India